Dolní Dunajovice is a municipality and village in Břeclav District in the South Moravian Region of the Czech Republic. It has about 1,700 inhabitants.

History
The first written mention of Dunajovice is from 1183. In the 13th century, it was property of the convent in Dolní Kounice.

Notable people
Karl Renner (1870–1950), Austrian chancellor and president

References

External links

 

Villages in Břeclav District